The Client (also referred to as John Grisham's The Client) is an American legal thriller drama television series developed by Judith Paige Mitchell that aired on CBS for one season, premiering with a two-hour pilot on September 17, 1995, and airing new episodes through April 16, 1996. The series was based on the 1994 film The Client, itself adapted from the 1993 John Grisham novel.  It starred JoBeth Williams, John Heard, and Polly Holliday in the roles created in the film by Susan Sarandon, Tommy Lee Jones, and Micole Mercurio, respectively.

Cast

Main
 JoBeth Williams as Reggie Love
 John Heard as Roy Foltrigg
 Polly Holliday as Momma Love
 David Barry Gray as Clint McGuire
 Ossie Davis as Judge Harry Roosevelt (13 episodes, 1995–96)

Recurring
 Valerie Mahaffey as Ellie Foltrigg (4 episodes, 1995–96)
 Mac Davis as Waldo Gaines (3 episodes 1995–96)
 David Michael Mullins as Lewis Maddox (7 episodes, 1995–96)
 Burke Moses as Jackson Love (6 episodes, 1995–96)
 William Converse-Roberts as Dr. Gus Cardoni (6 episodes, 1995–96)
 Derek McGrath as Arnie (4 episodes, 1996)
 Thom Barry as Judge Waite-Barkley (4 episodes, 1996)
 Brixton Karnes as Officer Brill (4 episodes, 1995–96)
 Harry Lennix as Daniel Holbrook (3 episodes, 1995–96)
 Emilio Borelli as Nick (3 episodes, 1996)
 Allen Williams as Howard Straithe (3 episodes, 1995–96)
 Timothy Carhart as Walon Clark (3 episodes, 1995)
 Emmanuelle Bach as Nicole (3 episodes, 1995–96)
 Ray McKinnon as Lenny Barlow (3 episodes, 1995)

Episodes

Syndication and home media
The TNT Network rebroadcast the series five nights a week, March 1999 through February 2001.

While the full series is not available on DVD or Blu-ray, the 1995 pilot episode of the series was included as a bonus feature on the 2013 Blu-ray release of the 1994 film.

References

External links 
 

1990s American workplace drama television series
1995 American television series debuts
1996 American television series endings
American legal drama television series
CBS original programming
English-language television shows
Television series by Warner Bros. Television Studios
Serial drama television series
Live action television shows based on films
Television shows based on American novels
1990s American legal television series
Television shows set in Atlanta
Television series based on adaptations